Nuestra Belleza Nuevo León 2009, was a pageant in Nuevo León, Mexico was held at the Teatro de la Ciudad in Monterrey, Nuevo León on June 22, 2009. At the conclusion of the final night of competition, Adriana Treviño of Monterrey was crowned the winner. Treviño was crowned by outgoing Nuestra Belleza Nuevo León titleholder, Mariana González. Ten contestants competed for the state title.

The pageant was hosted by Elsa Burgos and Arturo Carmona.

Results

Placements

Special awards

Judges
Patricio Borghetti - Singer
Grettell Valdéz - Actress
Anagabriela Espinoza - Nuestra Belleza Mundo México 2007 & Miss International 2009
Alejandra Villanueva - Nuestra Belleza Nuevo León 2003

Background Music
Alexander Acha - "Mujeres" & "Te Amo"
Tush - "Acostumbrado"

Contestants

References

External links
Official Website

Nuestra Belleza México